The 2013 Indiana State Sycamores football team represented Indiana State University in the 2013 NCAA Division I FCS football season. They were led by first year head coach Mike Sanford and played their home games at Memorial Stadium. They were a member of the Missouri Valley Football Conference. They finished the season 1–11, 0–8 in MVFC play to finish in last place.

Schedule

Source: Schedule

References

Indiana State
Indiana State Sycamores football seasons
Indiana State Sycamores football